San Pedro de Cachora District is one of the nine districts of the province Abancay in Peru.

Ethnic groups 
The people in the district are mainly indigenous citizens of Quechua descent. Quechua is the language which the majority of the population (62.43%) learnt to speak in childhood, 37.05% of the residents started speaking using the Spanish language (2007 Peru Census).

See also 
 Inka Raqay
 Inka Wasi

References

External links
 

Districts of the Abancay Province
Districts of the Apurímac Region